Carols in the Domain is an annual Australian Christmas concert event held in the Domain Gardens in Sydney. It began in 1983, and features many national and international performers and guest appearances. It a free event, broadcast around Australia on the Seven Network, and simulcast on Smooth FM. The event was held on the last Saturday before Christmas Eve until 2015; and has been held on the last Sunday before Christmas Eve since 2016. Carols in the Domain has become one of Australia's largest free Christmas events.

History
Carols in the Domain was started in 1983 by former Qantas employee Robyn Anne Hobbs, who observed Christmas carol events in Australia and wanted to develop one for Sydney. In an article in The Sydney Morning Herald, she said "I suppose I started Carols in the Domain from a purely selfish point of view because I'm an only child and Christmas and birthdays were always wonderful occasions to celebrate and yet Sydney didn't really have a major Christmas celebration." She chose The Salvation Army as the corresponding charity. The first Carols event in 1983 was attended by 15,000 people. Hosts of the event have included presenters of morning program Sunrise particularly David Koch and Natalie Barr who have co-presented on several occasions, previous presenters have also included Andrew Daddo (on seven occasions), Grant Denyer, (5 occasions), Kate Ritchie, (3 occasions) and Barry Crocker, on (3 occasions).
 
Hobbs was awarded an Order of Australia Medal (OAM – General Division) in 2009 for services to the community in founding Carols in the Domain and her fundraising efforts for the Salvation Army

The main sponsor is designated with naming rights. In 1989, the main sponsor was Esso. In 1996, the main sponsor was Pacific Power, however, because the government had split up the company, they could not fund the sponsorship, but the state government stepped in to sponsor the event, pledging over AUS$300,000. The event was televised for the first time to New Zealand on TVNZ and Southeast Asia on Australia Television. The Sydney Morning Herald also became a sponsor for the event.

In 1997, the naming rights sponsor was RAMS Home Loans. In 2004, the event was called "The Good Guys Good Kid Carols in the Domain". In 2005, the naming rights were assumed to be The Good Guys again, but Woolworths acquired the naming rights and renamed the event to "Woolworths Carols in the Domain", and has retained the name since.
As a mark of respect, organisers of the 2014 Carols in the Domain considered cancelling the event because of the Martin Place siege which took place in Sydney earlier that week, but instead decided to hold it, on Saturday 20 December. The 2014 Carols attracted approximately 80,000 people, and also included a tribute to those killed during the siege. Mark Vincent opened the evening by singing You Raise Me Up in honour of the victims, and a minute silence was held.

In December 2020 it was announced that the 2020 event would be held inside, at the Aware Theatre without any audience as a response to the COVID-19 pandemic, and then televised on Wednesday 23 December on Channel 7.

Charity
Carols in the Domain supports both The Salvation Army and The Salvation Army OASIS Youth Support Network through the sale of candle bags during the performance. Oasis seeks to assist homeless youths aged between 16–24 in the inner city of Sydney with emergency housing, case management and training.

List of past events
All events have included a visit by Santa Claus, and music from local orchestras and choirs.

See also
 Carols by Candlelight, a similar event in Melbourne.
 Christian music in Australia

References

External links
 
 The Salvation Army OASIS Youth Support Network

Festivals in Sydney
Christmas festivals
Seven Network specials